John Christopher Dixon (born 2 December 1942), billed as John D. Collins, is a British actor and narrator, perhaps best known for appearing in the BBC sitcom 'Allo 'Allo! in which he played Flt. Lt. Fairfax, a stranded British airman in occupied France during World War II. He is the actor to have been cast most frequently in writer/producer David Croft's hit sitcoms: a total of six different series and ten characters.

Biography

Collins won the Ivor Novello and Robert Donat Scholarships to RADA. After graduating he went on to run the Summer Theatre at Frinton-on-Sea, Essex for three years and then went to work in the first season of the Nottingham Playhouse.

In his early years he made a number of films including the Hammer Film Dracula Has Risen from the Grave (1968), the film versions of Till Death Us Do Part (1969) and Dad's Army (1971), The Adventures of Barry McKenzie (1972), The Ghoul (1975), and The Boys in Blue (1982), and also many plays for Granada Television. As a vicar in Coronation Street, he failed to marry Albert Tatlock.

For ten years he worked with Spike Milligan as his assistant director and as an actor, in Son of Oblomov and The Bed-Sitting Room. He also appeared with Milligan in his 'Q’ series on television.

He became a regular cast member of two television series – A Family at War and also with Robert Lindsay in Get Some In!. He first worked for David Croft in the film version of Dad's Army in 1971, and subsequently was cast in episodes of It Ain't Half Hot Mum, Hi-de-Hi!, Are You Being Served? and Oh, Doctor Beeching!, as well his regular role in 'Allo 'Allo! and the recurring character of Jerry in You Rang, M'Lord?.

Other TV work includes The Brittas Empire, On the Up, Birds of a Feather, Trial & Retribution, Peak Practice, Ain't Misbehavin', Harry's Mad, Wycliffe, Mosley, Some Mothers Do 'Ave 'Em, The Sweeney, Secret Army, Citizen Smith, Yes Minister, the Doctor Who serial Arc of Infinity, Only Fools and Horses and Lovejoy.

Other theatre credits includes the tour of When Did You Last See Your Trousers?, The Winslow Boy, That's Showbiz, Richard III and the title role in King Lear. He has also played the role of Mr. Paravicini in the record-breaking production of The Mousetrap at St Martin's Theatre, London.

Collins has appeared in a number of pantomimes as Abanazer and as an ugly sister in Cinderella. He has narrated The Snowman, Carnival of the Animals, Peter and the Wolf and William Walton's Façade and has also recorded a Shakespearean CD with the Gesualdo Consort. He has just played the voice of God in Noye's Fludde by Benjamin Britten and has been appearing regularly as Henry VIII at the banquets in the Old Palace at Hatfield House.

Collins made two appearances in the British BBC sitcom Only Fools and Horses, initially in the episode "Ashes to Ashes", as a river policeman who informs Del and Rodney that they have to have river permission to empty ashes into a river (St. Katharine Docks). He then appeared in the later episode "Sleeping Dogs Lie" as the Veterinarian.

Collins has also appeared in BBC children's programme, including ChuckleVision as a flying instructor in the 1996 episode Dear Diary.

Filmography

Film

Television

References

External links

1942 births
Living people
English male television actors
English male stage actors
English male film actors
Male actors from London
Alumni of RADA